Peter Warlock was the pseudonym adopted by the British composer and music scholar Philip Arnold Heseltine (1894–1930). He wrote over a hundred songs, a number of choral works and a small number of instrumental pieces. His general style has been summarised by his biographer Barry Smith as "an idiosyncratic harmonic language that comprise[s] an unusual mixture of Edwardiana, Delius, Van Dieren, Elizabethan and folk music, features that give his music a strongly personal voice". In addition to his own compositions he made transcriptions of Elizabethan and Jacobean vocal solo, choral, and instrumental works, and prepared an edition of Henry Purcell's string fantasias.

For choral works the acronym "SATB" (Soprano-Alto-Tenor-Bass) has been used to indicate the voice composition of the work. Divisions of individual voice parts are indicated by "SSAA..." etc.

References

 
Warlock, Peter, Lists of compositions by